Soma is the second studio album by the American doom metal band Windhand, released on September 17, 2013 by Relapse Records. It peaked at No. 24 on the Billboard Heatseekers Albums chart, making it the band's first release to make a Billboard chart.

Critical reception

Soma was named the third best metal album of 2013 by Rolling Stone.

Track listing

Personnel
Dorthia Cottrell – vocals
Asechiah Bogdan – guitars
Garret Morris – guitars
Parker Chandler – bass
Ryan Wolfe – drums

References

2013 albums
Windhand albums
Relapse Records albums